Blois Football 41 ("Quarante-et-un") is a French football club based in Blois, Centre-Val de Loire. In 1999, Association amicale de la jeunesse blésoise (commonly abbreviated as AAJB or AAJ Blois) has founded in 1912 merged with Blois Union Sportive, founded in 1984, to form the current club. They currently play in Championnat National 2, the fourth level of French football.

Blois spent nine seasons in Division 2 between 1970 and 1982.

The team plays at Allées Jean Leroi Municipal Stadium in Blois.

Honours
 Champion Championnat National 3 (Centre-Val de Loire Group) : 2018
 Champion Championnat de France Amateur de Football (Centre-West Group) : 1970
 Champion Championnat de France de football de Division 3 (West Group) : 1978 
 Champion DH Centre : 1933, 1955, 1990, 2004, 2016
 1/4 finalists of the Coupe de France in 1971 (home : Blois-Marseille 2–4 and away: Marseille-Blois 9–1)
 Champion DH centre féminin : 2007

Current squad

References

External links
  

Blois
Association football clubs established in 1912
1912 establishments in France
Association football clubs established in 1999
1999 establishments in France
Sport in Blois
Football clubs in Centre-Val de Loire